The Şiviţa oil field is an oil field located in Tulucești, Galați County. It was discovered in 1958 and developed by Petrom. It began production in 1968 and produces oil.

References

Oil fields in Romania